Matt Barrie is a sportscaster for ESPN's SportsCenter. He joined the show in March 2013. 

Prior to joining ESPN, Barrie covered high school sports for Dallas/Fort Worth's NBC-owned station KXAS-TV, then CBS affiliate WLTX and sports talk station WCOS in Columbia, South Carolina.

Earlier in his career, he was a general reporter for NBC affiliate WJFW-TV in Rhinelander, Wisconsin (also serving Wausau), where a 2002 remote interview with then-Governor of Wisconsin Scott McCallum from Madison regarding cuts in state shared services in the market's Northwoods region ended with McCallum agitated about Barrie's questions, and calling him a 'dumb son of a bitch' with his microphone still hot and the satellite connection still active, thinking his connection to WJFW and Barrie had already been severed. McCallum would later apologize for the outburst.

In addition to his SportsCenter duties, Barrie is the pregame and halftime show host for ESPN College Football Thursday Primetime with analysts Joey Galloway and Jesse Palmer. He is also a golf commentator for ESPN’s coverage of The Masters and PGA Championship.

Education
Barrie is a graduate of the Walter Cronkite School of Journalism at Arizona State University.

References

External links
 
 

American sports announcers
American television reporters and correspondents
American television sports anchors
American sports journalists
Arizona State University alumni
College football announcers
Disney people
ESPN people
Living people
People from Scottsdale, Arizona
Sports Emmy Award winners
Year of birth missing (living people)
Walter Cronkite School of Journalism and Mass Communication alumni
21st-century American journalists